The Ryan C-1 Foursome, also known as the "Baby Brougham" was a single-engine, four-seat light aircraft built by Ryan Aeronautical in the United States in 1930 as an executive transport. It was a high-wing, braced monoplane based on Ryan's highly successful Brougham design, but substantially smaller. The interior was luxuriously furnished, with deeply upholstered seats, and an oversize cabin door was fitted to ease boarding and disembarking for the three passengers.

Only three examples were built before deteriorating economic conditions led to the sale of the Ryan factory in October 1930. One of the three machines was fitted with a Packard DR-980 diesel engine and designated the C-2. This latter aircraft was lost during an attempted transatlantic crossing by Alex Loeb and Richard Decker in August 1939. They were en route to Ireland with (Palestine perhaps their intended final destination - this is supposition, not stated in the source article).

Variants
 C-1 - original version with Wright R-760 engine (2 built)
 C-2 - diesel-powered version with Packard DR-980 engine (1 built)

Specifications (C-1)

References

Notes

Bibliography
 
 
 
 
 

1930s United States business aircraft
Foursome
High-wing aircraft
Single-engined tractor aircraft
Aircraft first flown in 1930